The 1934 Fordham Rams football team was an American football team that represented Fordham University as an independent during the 1934 college football season. In its second year under head coach Jim Crowley, Fordham compiled a 5–3 record and outscored all opponents by a total of 165 to 92.

Schedule

References

Fordham
Fordham Rams football seasons
Fordham Rams football